Upper Freehold Baptist Meeting, also known as Ye Olde Yellow Meeting House, is a historic church located on Yellow Meetinghouse and Red Valley roads in the Red Valley section of Upper Freehold Township near Imlaystown in Monmouth County, New Jersey. It is the oldest Baptist meetinghouse in the state. It was added to the National Register of Historic Places on April 21, 1975 for its significance in religion and exploration/settlement.

History
An earlier building for the area Baptists was erected in 1720 on land donated by Thomas and Rachel Salter. The current meeting house was built in 1737. It is oriented so that the gable ends are facing due east and west, to maximize sunlight on the southern side. The first resident minister for the congregation was David Jones (1736–1820). The parsonage was built .

Cemetery
The oldest dated grave in the Yellow Meeting House Cemetery is Salter's son, John, who died August 29, 1723. The  cemetery has about two hundred graves.

Notable burials
James Cox (1753–1810), member of the United States House of Representatives (from New Jersey)
Elisha Lawrence (1746–1799), Federalist Party politician and acting governor of New Jersey in 1790

See also
 National Register of Historic Places listings in Monmouth County, New Jersey
 List of the oldest buildings in New Jersey

References

External links
 
 
 
 

Baptist churches in New Jersey
Churches on the National Register of Historic Places in New Jersey
Churches completed in 1737
Churches in Monmouth County, New Jersey
National Register of Historic Places in Monmouth County, New Jersey
Upper Freehold Township, New Jersey
New Jersey Register of Historic Places
18th-century Baptist churches in the United States
1737 establishments in New Jersey